A general election was held in the U.S. state of Colorado on November 4, 2014. All of Colorado's executive officers were up for election as well as a United States Senate seat and all of Colorado's seven seats in the United States House of Representatives. Primary elections were held on June 24, 2014.

Governor and lieutenant governor

Incumbent Democratic Governor John Hickenlooper and his Lieutenant Governor Joseph García ran for re-election to a second term in office. They were unopposed for the Democratic nomination In Colorado, gubernatorial candidates pick their running mates and they are elected on the same ticket.

The Republicans nominee was former U.S. Representative and nominee for governor in 2006 Bob Beauprez, whose running mate was Douglas County Commissioner Jill Repella. He defeated Secretary of State of Colorado Scott Gessler, former Minority Leader of the Colorado Senate Mike Kopp and former U.S. Representative and Constitution Party nominee for governor in 2010 Tom Tancredo in the primary election.

Libertarian Matthew Hess and his running mate Brandon Young, Greens Bill Bartlett and Harry Hempy and Independents Mike Dunafon, Mayor of Glendale, and Jim Rundberg also ran.

Attorney General
Incumbent Republican Attorney General John Suthers was term-limited and could not run for re-election to a third term in office.

Republican primary
The Republican nominee was Chief Deputy Attorney General Cynthia Coffman, wife of U.S. Representative Mike Coffman. Mark Waller, former Minority Leader of the Colorado House of Representatives, had been running, but he withdrew from the race. At the Republican state assembly on April 12, 2014, Coffman received the support of 69% of the delegates, while Waller received 30.7%, only narrowly passing the 30% needed to win a place on the primary ballot. On April 28, Waller announced that he was withdrawing from the race. Weld County District Attorney and nominee for the U.S. Senate in 2010 Ken Buck was a speculated Republican candidate, but he declined in order to run for the U.S. Senate, later dropping down to run for Colorado's 4th congressional district. Attorney Mario Nicolais was also speculated to run, but he also declined to do so. He instead ran for the State Senate.

Democratic primary
The Democratic nominee was former Deputy Attorney General and former District Attorney from the Seventeenth Judicial District Don Quick. President of the Colorado Senate Morgan Carroll and District Attorneys Mitch Morrissey and Stan Garnett, who was the nominee for attorney general in 2010, were also speculated to run for the Democratic nomination, but declined to do so.

General election

Polling

Results

Secretary of State
Incumbent Republican Secretary of State Scott Gessler did not run for re-election to a second term in office. He instead ran unsuccessfully for governor.

Republican primary
El Paso County Clerk & Recorder Wayne W. Williams was the Republican nominee. Arapahoe County Commissioner Nancy Doty considered running, but decided against it.

Democratic primary
Regent of the University of Colorado Joe Neguse was the Democratic nominee. Former Majority Leader of the Colorado Senate and nominee for secretary of state in 2006 Ken Gordon had also declared his candidacy in December 2012, though it was unclear if he was continuing in the race after Neguse entered in June 2013. Gordon died of a heart attack in December 2013. Former State Senator Angela Giron also considered running for the Democratic nomination, but she decided against it.

American Constitution primary
Amanda Campbell, the American Constitution Party nominee for the State House in 2008 and for secretary of state in 2010 ran again.

General election

Polling

Results

State Treasurer
Incumbent Republican State Treasurer Walker Stapleton ran for re-election to a second term in office.

Republican primary
Stapleton was unopposed for the Republican nomination.

Democratic primary
Former U.S. Representative and former Assistant Secretary for Intergovernmental Affairs in the United States Department of Homeland Security Betsy Markey was the Democratic nominee. Pat Quinn, the outgoing Mayor of Broomfield, had also declared his candidacy in June 2013, but he withdrew from the race in November 2013.

General election

Polling

 * Internal poll for the Pat Quinn campaign

Results

United States Senate

Incumbent Democratic Senator Mark Udall unsuccessfully ran for re-election to a second term in office.

U.S. Representative Cory Gardner was the Republican nominee, businessman Gaylon Kent was the Libertarian nominee, Unity Party of America founder and National Chairman Bill Hammons is the Unity Party nominee, and neurosurgeon and conservative activist Steve Shogan ran as an Independent.

United States House of Representatives

All of Colorado's seven seats in the United States House of Representatives were up for election in 2014.

References

 
Colorado